Visions of Europe  is 2004 anthology film consisting of 25 short films by 25 different directors from Europe.

References

External links

 

2004 comedy-drama films
2004 films
Anthology films